François Béranger (1937, Amilly, Loiret – 2003) was a French singer and left libertarian.

Selected filmography
 1973 :  L'An 01

References

External links

1937 births
2003 deaths
People from Loiret
French anarchists
Deaths from cancer in France
20th-century French male singers